Yelanets is an urban-type settlement in Voznesensk Raion of Mykolaiv Oblast, Ukraine. It hosts the administration of Yelanets settlement hromada, one of the hromadas of Ukraine. Population: 

The settlement is located at the left bank of the Hnylyi Yelanets River, a right tributary of the Southern Bug.

History
Yelanets was founded in the 1800s as Hnylyi Yelanets. In 1810, it was renamed Novomoskovsk, and in 1818 has become a military settlement which belonged to Yelisavetgradsky Uyezd of Kherson Governorate. In 1828, Yelisavetgradsky Uyezd was merged with Olviopolsky Uyezd into Bobrinetsky Uyezd. In 1857, military settlements were abolished. In 1858, Novomoskovsk was renamed Yelanets. In 1865, the administrative center of Bobrinetsky Uyezd was moved to Yelisavetgrad, and the uyezd was renamed Yelisavetgradsky. Yelanets was a selo and the center of Yelanetskaya Volost of Yelisavetgradsky Uyezd.

On 16 April 1920, Kherson Governorate was renamed Nikolayev Governorate, and on 21 October 1922, it was merged into Odessa Governorate. In 1923, uyezds were abolished, and Yelanets was included in the newly established Voznesensk Raion of Mykolaiv Okruha. In 1925, the governorates were abolished, and okruhas were directly subordinated to Ukrainian Soviet Socialist Republic. In 1926, Yelanets Raion of Mykolaiv Okruha, with the administrative center in Yelanets, was established. In 1930, okruhas were abolished. In 1935, Yelanets Raion was transferred to Odessa Oblast. On 22 September 1937, Mykolaiv Oblast was established on lands which previously belonged to Dnipropetrovsk and Odessa Oblasts, and Yelanets Raion has become a part of newly created Mykolaiv Oblast. In 1968, Yelanets was granted an urban-type settlement status.

On 18 July 2020, Yelanets Raion was abolished as part of the administrative reform of Ukraine, which reduced the number of raions of Mykolaiv Oblast to four. The area of Yelanets Raion was merged into Voznesensk Raion.

Economy

Transportation

References

Urban-type settlements in Voznesensk Raion
Yelisavetgradsky Uyezd